Saint Gregory at Prayer was an oil-on-panel painting by Annibale Carracci, showing the scene in Gregory the Great's life when an image of the Virgin Mary spoke to him while he prayed before it.

It was commissioned by cardinal Anton Maria Salviati for the personal chapel he had had built at San Gregorio al Celio in Rome. It can thus only date to between his becoming commendatory abbot of the Camaldolese monastery at San Gregorio al Celio in 1600 and his death in 1602. The saint is shown looking towards a wall of the chapel on which then hung an icon of the Virgin Mary, an overlapping of imaginary and real space which involves the viewer in the space and time of the event shown in the painting and made the painting one of the earliest examples of Baroque illusionism.

The work was seized by French occupying forces in 1798 – its gap at San Gregorio has been filled by an anonymous copy of the work. However, whilst it was en route to Paris, Vincenzo Camuccini somehow acquired it in Genoa and sent it to Britain. There it was sold to a Lord Radstock and later entered the collections at Bridgewater House in London. It and many other works, including others by Annibale, were destroyed in May 1941 during the London Blitz.

Related works

References

Paintings by Annibale Carracci
Lost paintings
Paintings of Pope Gregory I
1602 paintings